Chapter 6: The Parliament.  Chapter 6 of the Fiji Constitution is titled The Parliament.  The five Parts, further subdivided into forty sections making up this chapter, set out the composition, functions, and powers of Fiji's bicameral legislature.

Part 1: The Parliament (general overview)
 See main articles: Cabinet of Fiji; Parliament of Fiji

Part 1 of Chapter 6 sets out the general functions of the Parliament.  It comprises sections 45 through 49 of the Constitution.

Section 45 vests legislative power in Parliament, which is declared to consist of the President, the House of Representatives, and the Senate.  According to British constitutional theory, on which much of the Fijian Constitution is based, the British Parliament consists not only of the House of Commons and the House of Lords, but also the reigning Monarch, who is replaced by the President in the Fijian context.  This had important constitutional ramifications.  The Westminster parliamentary model followed in Fiji affirms the distinction between the executive and legislative branches of government, but does not separate them to the same extent as the American model does; there is considerable overlap.  Although the office of the President is a largely honorary one, modeled on the British Monarchy, the Cabinet officially exercises executive authority in his name, and the President's status as a part of the Parliament is the source of the power of the Cabinet to initiate legislation.

Section 46 sets out the way in which legislative power is to be exercised.  Bills become law on being passed by the two Houses of the Parliament, and assented to by the President.  The latter step is a mere formality, however, as the President is expressly forbidden in this Section to refuse his assent.  He therefore has no veto.  This follows British practice, though not theory: no British Monarch has vetoed a bill for almost three hundred years (the last exercise of a veto was by Queen Anne in 1708), and "common law" makes it doubtful that any future Monarch would consider himself or herself at liberty to do so.  The Fijian Constitution formalizes this ban on the royal veto.  Prior to 1987, Fiji's Head of State was, in fact, the British Monarch.  When Fiji became a republic and replaced the Monarch with a President, no drastic changes were made to the institutions of the state, or to their functions.

Sections 47 through 49 deal with the relative powers of the two houses of Parliament with respect to the passage of bills.  All bills are to originate in the House of Representatives; the Senate has the power, with some limitations, to review, amend, or veto such bills.  Senatorial amendments must be agreed to by the House of Representatives.  The House of Representatives may override a Senate veto, provided that the same bill was passed by two consecutive sessions of the House of Representatives with an interval of at least six months.

There are three exceptions to these rules.
1. The Senate's veto over amendments to the Constitution is absolute; the House of Representatives may not override it.
2. The Senate may not amend money bills, defined as "Bills imposing taxation or appropriating revenue or moneys."  It may, however, reject such a bill in its entirety within twenty-one days of receiving it.  If, at the end of twenty-one days, the Senate has done nothing about a money bill, it is deemed to have passed it.
3. If the Prime Minister certifies in writing to the President of the Senate that a bill passed by the House of Representatives is "urgent," the Senate has a maximum of seven days to decide on its fate.  If at the end of the seven days the Senate has done nothing about the bill, it is deemed to have passed it.

Greater powers given to the House of Representatives because it is popularly elected.  The Senate's absolute veto over constitutional amendments, however, reflects the view of the framers of the Constitution that safeguards were necessary to protect it from being lightly tampered with by putting a veto in the hands of a body less susceptible to electoral pressure.  With its built-in near-majority of Fijian chiefs, the Senate was also seen as a bulwark against attempts to amend the Constitution at the expense of ethnic Fijians.

Part 2: The House of Representatives

Part 2 of Chapter 6, comprising Sections 50 through 63, establishes the House of Representatives, commonly called the "Lower House" of the Parliament.

Sections 50 through 54 deal with the composition of the House.  It is to consist of 71 members elected from single-member electorates by a system of transferable voting, under which the votes of the lowest-polling candidates are successively added to those of the second choice indicated by the voter.  25 members are to be elected by universal suffrage.  The remaining 46 are to be elected by voters on closed electoral rolls representing Fiji's ethnic communities: 23 ethnic Fijians, 19 Indo-Fijians, 1 Rotuman Islander, and 3 "General Electors" (Europeans, Chinese, and other minorities).  With the exception of 17 "provincial" electorates representing rural ethnic Fijians, which follow traditional provincial boundaries, all other electorates are to be substantially equal in population.

The make up of the House of Representatives was one of the most controversial sections issues to be decided by the constitution.  It was not a new problem; it had delayed independence in the 1960s, and two previous constitutions, adopted in 1970 and 1990 had foundered on it.  The 1970 Constitution had provided for a 52-member House, with 22 ethnic Fijians, 22 Indo-Fijians, and 8 General Electors, with approximately half of each ethnic group's representatives elected by a closed electoral roll and the remainder by universal suffrage.  Hardline elements among the ethnic Fijian community resented the power this arrangement gave Indo-Fijian voters over ethnic Fijian representatives, especially in urban areas where Indo-Fijians were disproportionately concentrated, and was one of the reasons for the abrogation of this Constitution following the revolution of 1987.  The 1990 Constitution abolished the common franchise, and established a 70-member House of Representatives elected on four closed electoral rolls: 37 ethnic Fijians, 27 Indo-Fijians, 1 Rotuman Islander, and 5 General Electors.  Many Indo-Fijians bitterly resented the allocation to them of ten seats fewer than to ethnic Fijians, despite their being nearly equal in population.  It also led to international condemnation, which helped to trigger the review of the constitution in the mid-1990s.

In the drawing up of the present constitution, many Indo-Fijians, including the Labour Party leader Mahendra Chaudhry, pushed for a common roll and for the abolition of the communal electoral rolls, believing that it inhibited the formation of multi-racial political parties with a vision for the whole country; instead, voting typically followed ethnic rather than ideological lines.  Many ethnic Fijians, however, wanted the specific allocation of seats to be elected by closed electoral rolls to be maintained, believing that their interests would not be adequately protected by politicians who were not answerable solely to ethnic Fijian voters.  Under the mediation of Sir Paul Reeves, a former Governor-General of New Zealand, a compromise was worked out, according to which more than a third of the House of Representatives would be elected by universal sufferance and the remainder by ethnic voters on closed rolls, but with no single ethnic group allocated the 24 seats required to block constitutional amendments.

Sections 55 through 58 prescribe the qualifications a person must have, to be an elector for the House of Representatives.  All Fijian citizens aged 21 or over, "or such other age as the Parliament prescribes," who have been physically resident in Fiji for the two years immediately prior to their registration, are entitled to enroll on (a) a Common Roll, as an elector for one of the 25 "open electorates," so-called because they are open to candidates of all races, elected by voters of all races, and (b) one of the four communal ethnic rolls, as an elector for a constituency reserved for one of the four recognized ethnic groups.  Registration and voting are both compulsory.

For electoral purposes, this Section defines an ethnic Fijian as any descendant of a native inhabitant of Fiji (other than Rotuma).  The Polynesian Rotuman Islanders are excluded, unless they also have some ethnic Fijian ancestry (predominantly Melanesian), because they have their own electoral roll.  An Indo-Fijian is defined as any descendant of a native of the Indian Sub-continent, and therefore potentially includes people of Bengali, Bhutanese, Nepali, Pakistani, and Sri Lankan, as well as Indian, descent.  Rotuman Islanders are defined as any descendant of an inhabitant of Rotuma.  Ancestry may be traced through either the male or the female line, and there is no "blood quantum" - how close or how distant one's relationship to a particular ethnic group is irrelevant, provided that it can be proved.

The fourth electoral roll, for General Electors, is for people who have no ethnic Fijian, Indo-Fijian, or Rotuman ancestry, as well as for individuals who have such ancestry but choose, for whatever reason, not to register on the electoral roll reserved for their particular ethnic community.  It is thus a very diverse roll; it includes Europeans, Chinese, Banaban Islanders, as well as small numbers of individuals of ethnic Fijian, Indo-Fijian, and Rotuman descent who have chosen this roll in preference to their ethnic roll.

The General Electors' roll had an interesting history.  Prior to 1997, it also included all persons who had an ethnic Fijian mother but a non-Fijian father, as ethnic identity was defined according to the male line, a fact which caused considerable resentment among the large numbers of "Part Europeans" (who had a European father or paternal grandfather) and "Chinese Fijians" (whose father or paternal grandfather was Chinese).  The popular politician, James Ah Koy, appealed against the stipulation in the former 1990 Constitution that required him to register as a General Elector rather than as an ethnic Fijian, on account of his Chinese father, and it was partly due to his efforts that the 1997 Constitution allows ethnic identity to follow the line of either parent.

The Constitution is clear that a person is not permitted to be registered simultaneously on more than one ethnic roll.  Persons of multiracial ancestry must make a choice as to which roll to register for, although they remain free to change their registration at any time.

Section 58 establishes the required qualifications of candidates for the House of Representatives.  A candidate for an "open electorate" must be registered on the Common Roll, and a candidate for a communal ethnic electorate must be registered on the roll reserved for that particular group.  No person is permitted to be nominated as a candidate for more than one electorate in a particular election.  Undischarged bankrupts, and people deemed to have a conflict of interest as defined by law, are disqualified from being candidates.

Sections 59 through 63 set the term of the House of Representatives at a maximum of five years.  Within seven days of the expiry of the five-year term, the Prime Minister must advise the President to issue writs for a general election.  In certain circumstances, elections may be called sooner; these circumstances are spelled out elsewhere in the Constitution.

If a seat in the House of Representatives becomes vacant through the death, resignation, or disqualification of the person holding it, a byelection may be ordered to fill the vacancy.  If the vacancy occurs in the final six months of the Parliamentary term, however, a byelection is not to be held.

Part 3: The Senate
 See main article: Senate of Fiji

Part 3 of Chapter 6, comprising Sections 64 through 66, establishes the Senate, or "Lower House," of the Fijian Parliament.

The number of Senators is set at 32.  The term of the Senate is synchronized with that of the House of Representatives: a five-year term, or less, if the House of Representatives is dissolved sooner.  Membership qualifications are the same as for the House of Representatives.  Senators are officially appointed by the President, but his role is a mere formality, as Section 64 requires him to ratify the nominees of the Great Council of Chiefs (14), the Prime Minister (9), the Leader of the Opposition (8), and the Council of Rotuma (1).  The Prime Minister's nominees generally come from his own political party or coalition.  Except for the Prime Minister's party, the nominees of the Leader of the Opposition must represent every political party with more than 8 seats in the House of Representatives, in proportion to its total membership.  Persons proposed by the Leader of the Opposition must have been selected by their respective parties, not by the Leader of the Opposition himself.  If the event of the office of the Leader of the Opposition being vacant, the Prime Minister must adopt the role of the Leader of the Opposition in filling the 8 Senate seats, and must follow the same formula that would be required of the Leader of the Opposition.  If a seat in the Senate becomes vacant through the death or resignation of a Senator, the vacancy is filled by the same party by which the former Senator was nominated.

The Senate had had a rather colourful history.  It owed its creation and continued existence to the perceived need to balance the competing interests of Fiji's ethnic communities, as well as to accommodate Fiji's traditional chiefly power structure.  To safeguard their interests, ethnic Fijians wanted a formal role for their traditional chiefs.  A dominant built-in role for them was unacceptable to the Indo-Fijian community, but they were willing to accommodate the chiefly system in the framework of an "upper house," modeled on the British House of Lords.  As part of the compromise of 1970, agreed upon by the main political parties representing the two major communities, a Senate was established with 22 members, with 8 nominated by the Great Council of Chiefs, 7 by the Prime Minister, 6 by the Leader of the Opposition, and 1 by the Council of Rotuma.  As either the government or the opposition would almost certainly be led by an ethnic Fijian, the effect was to give the ethnic Fijian community a built-in two-thirds majority in the Senate.

After the revolution of 1987, instigated by ethnic Fijian nationalists, the Senate was expanded to 34 members.  Indo-Fijians were outraged by the reservation of 24 Senate seats for nominees of the Great Council of Chiefs, giving them well over a two-thirds majority.  One Senate seat was reserved, as before, for a nominee of the Council of Rotuma.  A further 9 Senators were to be appointed by the President, after "consulting" with the Indo-Fijian and other communities.  This extreme imbalance was one of the greatest grievances of the Indo-Fijian community, and in the constitutional review of the mid-1990s, all parties agreed to restore the 1970 model, with some changes.  Reserving 14 Senate seats for nominees of the Great Council of Chiefs gave them the quota (more than a third) required to veto amendments to the constitution, while reserving seats for Government and Opposition nominees, the latter reflecting the political composition of the House of Representatives, guaranteed an acceptable, if not numerically equitable, measure of representation to Indo-Fijians and other minorities.

Interesting and perhaps significantly, the reform of the Fijian Senate coincided with, and had close parallels to, constitutional reforms in the United Kingdom which altered the composition of the House of Lords.  According to reforms of the late 1990s, some 500 hereditary nobles elect 92 Lords from among themselves to exercise voting rights in the House of Lords; there are also some 600 life peers nominated by the Government and Opposition. Sir Paul Reeves, the former Governor General of New Zealand who advised Fiji's constitutional convention of the 1990s, was very familiar with the British constitutional reforms, and it is therefore not surprising that Fiji enacted reforms so similar to those of the United Kingdom.  The 14 nominees of the Great Council of Chiefs correspond to the 92 Lords chosen from among the nobles, while the nominees of the Prime Minister and the Leader of the Opposition correspond to Britain's life peers (although, unlike life peers, they are term-limited).

Part 4: Both Houses
Part 4 of Chapter 6, comprising Sections 67 through 74, lays down miscellaneous rules applicable to both houses of Parliament.

Section 67 declares membership of, or nomination for, either house to be incompatible with any "public office."  On being nominated for the House of Representatives or the Senate, any person holding a public office is deemed to have resigned from it.  This rule does not apply, however, to Cabinet ministers or to the Leader of the Opposition - these are required to be members of Parliament.

Section 68 requires the Prime Minister to advise the President to summon Parliament to meet not later than 30 days following a general election.  Other sessions are called by the President on the advice of the Prime Minister, but no more than 6 months are allowed to elapse between the end of one session and the beginning of another.  Special sessions of Parliament may also be called by the President if at least 18 members of the House of Representatives request such a session in writing.

Sections 69 and 70 set out the rules for voting in both houses.  To become law, a bill need a majority of the votes, plus one, of the members present in each of both houses.  If the votes are equally divided, the bill is deemed to be defeated.  24 of the 71 members of the House of Representatives, and 12 of the 32 Senators, constitute a quorum; without a quorum, the session of the particular House must be adjourned at the demand of a member present.  If, however, no member present at the session objects to the absence of a quorum, the particular House may continue functioning.

Sections 71 and 72 lay down the rules according to which seats in the Parliament may become vacant.  A vacancy occurs with the death or resignation of a Representative or Senator.  A Member of Parliament is deemed to have resigned from office in the event of the following circumstances: appointment to public office; bankruptcy; absence without permission of the Speaker of the House of Representatives, or of the President of the Senate, for 2 consecutive sessions; election or appointment to the other House of Parliament; and, in the case of members of the House of Representatives, resignation or expulsion from the political party for which he or she was elected.  In the event of a judicial ruling, proceedings that may have taken place in the House of Representatives or the Senate are not invalidated if it transpires that a person's membership in that house was invalid.

Section 73 lays down the rules for the challenging of election results in court.  A special court, the Court of Disputed Returns, is established for this purpose.

Section 74 deals with parliamentary proceedings.  It declares English to be the official language of the Parliament, but allows members to address either House in Bau Fijian or Hindustani.  Parliament must establish at least 5 standing committees; Cabinet ministers are not permitted to serve on such committees.

Part 5 Institutions and Offices

Part 5 of Chapter 6, comprising Sections 75 through 84, establishes several institutions and offices of the Parliament, or pertaining to the parliament.

Sections 75 through 77 establish the Constituency Boundaries Commission, which is empowered to determine the boundaries of electoral districts.  It had three members: one nominated by the Prime Minister, one by the Leader of the Opposition, and a Chairman, chosen by the President.  All three are officially appointed by the President, but his role in the appointment of the first two is a formality.  In choosing the Chairperson, however, the President acts "in his or her own judgement," though he must consult both the Prime Minister and the Leader of the Opposition.  The Chairperson must be a judge, or be qualified to be one.  Persons who are or have been members of the Senate or of the House of Representatives at any time during the preceding 4 years, members of local government authorities, and civil servants are disqualified from serving on the Constituency Boundaries Commission, in order to safeguard its political impartiality.

Section 78 establishes the Electoral Commission.  It is charged with voter registration, and with any other functions that may be "conferred on it by written law."  It must report annually to the President concerning its activities, and a copy of the report must be submitted to each of the two Houses of Parliament.

The Electoral Commission consists of five members: a Chairperson, appointed by the President "acting in his or her own judgement," and four other members "appointed by the President on the advice of the Prime Minister following consultation by the Prime Minister with the Leader of the Opposition."  The Chairperson must be a judge, or have the required qualifications to be a judge.  Members of the Senate, the House of Representatives, local government authorities, and the civil service are disqualified from membership, as are persons who are candidates for election to the House of Representatives or to any local authority.

Section 79 establishes the office of Supervisor of Elections.  It is charged with organizing elections.  He or she is appointed by the Constitution Offices Commission, after consulting with the relevant Cabinet Minister, but is responsible to, and is entitled to attend the meetings of, the Electoral Commission.  The Supervisor of Elections must be a fully qualified and registered barrister and solicitor.

All legislation pertaining to electoral matters must be presented to the Supervisor of Elections and to the Electoral Commission for comment.

Section 80 establishes the offices of Speaker and Deputy Speaker of the House of Representatives.  At their first meeting following a general election, or whenever one or both of the offices may be vacant, the House of Representatives is required to elect a Speaker and a Deputy Speaker.  In order to promote the impartiality of the office, the Speaker is elected from outside of Parliament.  The Deputy Speaker, however, is required to be a member of the House of Representatives.  The offices of Speaker and Deputy Speaker are incompatible with any other public office.  Cabinet Ministers, Senators, and other public servants are disqualified.

The Speaker may be dismissed by a two-thirds vote of the House of Representatives.

Section 81 establishes the offices of President of the Senate and Vice-President of the Senate.  Following a general election, and at any other time when either one of the offices may be vacant, elect from among their own members, a President and a Vice-President.  These offices are incompatible with all others; Cabinet Ministers, members of the House of Representatives, and other public servants are disqualified.

Section 82 establishes the office of Leader of the Opposition.  The Leader of the Opposition is appointed by the President on the basis of his opinion as to who would most likely be the most acceptable to the majority of the members of the opposition party or parties.  The leader of the Opposition must be a member of the House of Representatives.  The Leader of the Opposition chooses eight members of the Senate, and had the right to be consulted on a very wide range of issues.  The "Opposition" is taken to be the members of all political parties in the House of Representatives, except those that support the Prime Minister.

Section 83 establishes the Parliamentary Emoluments Commission.  It determines the salaries of Representatives and Senators, Cabinet Ministers, the Leader of the Opposition, and all officers of the Parliament.  It had three members - a Chairperson of the Parliamentary Emoluments Commission and two other members, at least one of whom must be a fully qualified and experiences actuary or accountant.  The three members of the commission are appointed by the President, on the advice of the relative standing committee in the House of Representatives.

Section 84 establishes the position of Secretary General to Parliament, and several other offices such as the Secretary to the House of Representatives and the Secretary to the Senate. The Secretary General is appointed by the Constitutional Offices Commission.  The other two are appointed by the Public Services Commission (Fiji)

1997 Constitution of Fiji